Thysochromis is a genus of cichlids native to West and Middle Africa.

Species
There are currently two recognized species in this genus:
 Thysochromis annectens (Boulenger, 1913) (possibly conspecific with T. ansorgii)
 Thysochromis ansorgii Boulenger, 1901

References

Chromidotilapiini
Cichlid genera
Taxa named by Jacques Daget